The People's State of Bavaria was a short-lived socialist state in Bavaria from 1918 to 1919. The People's State of Bavaria was established on 8 November 1918 during the German Revolution, as an attempt at a socialist state to replace the Kingdom of Bavaria. The state was led by Kurt Eisner until his assassination in February 1919, and co-existed with the rival Bavarian Soviet Republic from 6 April 1919, with its government under Johannes Hoffmann exiled in Bamberg. The People's State of Bavaria was dissolved upon the establishment of the Free State of Bavaria on 14 August 1919.

Background

The roots of the People's State of Bavaria lay in the German Empire's defeat in the First World War and the social tensions that came to a head shortly thereafter.  From this chaos erupted the German Revolution of 1918.  At the end of October 1918, German sailors began a series of revolts in Kiel and other naval ports.  In early November, these disturbances spread civil unrest across Germany.

Munich, the capital of Bavaria, was "an island of anarchic bohemianism and political radicalism in an otherwise predominantly Roman Catholic rural sea of small towns and timber houses scattered across the foothills of the Alps," according to Michael Burleigh. Alan Bullock writes that "Few towns in the Reich were as sensitive to the mood of unrest as Munich: its political atmosphere was unstable and exaggerated towards one extreme or the other," and, according to Joachim Fest, "No other city in Germany had been so shaken by the events and emotions of the revolution and the first postwar weeks as excitable Munich."

Extensive constitutional reforms of the governing structure of the Kingdom of Bavaria, under discussion between the royal government and all parliamentary groups since September 1917, were agreed to on 2 November 1918.  These included, among other things, the introduction of proportional representation and the transformation of the constitutional monarchy into a parliamentary monarchy.  However, events on the ground were outpacing these measures.

Beginning on 3 November 1918, protests initiated by the socialist Independent Social Democratic Party of Germany (USPD) called for peace and demanded the release of detained leaders.  On the afternoon of 7 November 1918, the first anniversary of the Russian revolution, Kurt Eisner, an idealistic Independent Social Democratic Party politician addressed a crowd estimated to have been about 60,000 on the Theresienwiese – current site of the Oktoberfest – in Munich.  He demanded an immediate peace, an eight-hour workday, relief for the unemployed, abdication of Bavarian King Ludwig III and the German emperor, Kaiser Wilhelm II, and proposed the formation of workers' and soldiers' councils.  The crowd marched to the army barracks and won over most of the soldiers; those who didn't go over to the revolution were too war-weary to mount any resistance to it. The combined group, estimated to be more than 100,000, then marched to the Residenz Palace. That night, King Ludwig, abandoned by the army, fled from the Palace with his family and took up residence in Anif Palace in nearby Salzburg, for what he hoped would be a temporary stay.  He was the first of the monarchs in the German Empire to be deposed.

The next day, Eisner, a well-known figure with a long black beard who invariably wore a black overcoat and hat and steel-rimmed spectacles, having gotten the approval of the local revolutionary workers' and soldiers' councils, declared Bavaria a "free state" – synonymous to "republic" – a declaration which overthrew the monarchy of the Wittelsbach dynasty, which had ruled Bavaria for over 700 years, and Eisner became Minister-President of Bavaria.  Eisner was a middle-class Jew who had been a drama critic in Berlin before he left his wife and family to come to Munich, where he took up with a female journalist, frequented the cafés of the Schwabing district of the city, and wrote reviews for the Müchener Post – although he later lost his job because he was part of the "revisionist right-wing" of the Social Democratic Party, which wanted the party to drop its attachment to Marxist ideology.

Eisner helped found the Munich branch of the Independent Social Democratic Party and became known for his anti-war stance, which had garnered him eight months in jail after he organized a number of peace strikes in January 1918; he was released under a general amnesty in October 1918. Despite his gift for rhetoric and oratory, Eisner had no political or administrative experience when he became minister-president.

Eisner government

On 12 November 1918, King Ludwig III signed the Anif declaration releasing both civil and military officers from their oaths; the newly-formed Eisner government interpreted this as an abdication, although to date, no member of the royal House of Wittelsbach has ever formally renounced the throne.

Though he advocated a socialist republic, Eisner distanced himself from the Russian Bolsheviks, declaring that his government would protect property rights. For a few days, the Munich social market economist Lujo Brentano served as People's Commissar for Trade (Volkskommissar für Handel).

On 7 January 1919, a Provisional State Constitution (Vorläufiges Staatsgrundgesetz) was promulgated.

The new republic started out with many strikes against them.  None of the leaders were native Bavarians, and they were bohemians and intellectuals – many of them Jewish – who were conspicuous in their anti-bourgeois bias.  Those from the right called Eisner a "foreign, racially alien vagabond" and a Bolshevist, and his associates as "unscrupulous alien scoundrels", "Jewish rascals" and "misleaders of labor".  Eisner did not help matters by declaring his regime would have "government by kindness", and would create a "realm of light, beauty and reason."  There were frequent spectacles such as parades, demonstrations, concerts, and speeches, but the regime's philosophical Utopianism won over few converts.  Eisner even admitted to German guilt for World War I at a socialist conference in Bern, Switzerland, and, with his secretary Felix Fechenbach, published papers from the official archives of Bavaria which showed the German complicity in the Austrian ultimatum to Serbia in July 1914, after the assassination of Archduke Ferdinand. Even cabinet ministers were dissatisfied with Eisner's leadership: one of them told him "You are an anarchist ... You are no statesman, you are a fool ... We are being ruined by bad management." An organized campaign for Eisner's removal from office was not long in coming.

As the new government was unable to provide basic services, it soon lost the support of the conservative Bavarian countryside, necessary for any government to hold together in the rural province. Eisner's USPD was defeated in the January 1919 election, coming in sixth place, with only 3 per cent of the vote, and only garnering three seats in the Bavarian Parliament (the Landtag), while the Bavarian People's Party got 66 seats.  Eisner, apparently because he was loath to give up power, delayed calling the Landtag into session until public pressure from all quarters – including a death threat from the Thule Society if he did not give up his office – forced him to.  Finally, he set the legislature to meet on 21 February 1919, more than a month after the election.

As he was on his way to the Landtag to announce his resignation, Eisner was shot dead by the right-wing nationalist Anton Graf von Arco auf Valley, a decorated aristocratic former cavalryman now a student at the University of Munich, who was a believer in the "stab-in-the-back myth", which held that Jews, socialists and other undesirable elements had caused Germany to lose World War I. As a Jew, a socialist, a Bohemian, and a Berliner, Eisner was the perfect target. Arco-Valley had been humiliated when a Leftist mob tore off his cockade from his hat after the war, and then endured further humiliation when he was rejected from membership in the anti-Semitic Thule Society because of Jewish ancestry on his mother's side.

After the assassination
After the shooting, Arco-Valley was saved from lynching on the spot by the fast action of Eisner's secretary, Fechenbach. Instead, he was arrested and taken to Stadelheim Prison where, coincidentally, he was put in the same cell that Eisner had served time in earlier.  Despite the assassination of Eisner, the Landtag convened, and Erhard Auer – the leader of the Social Democrats and the Minister of the Interior in Eisner's government – began to eulogize Eisner, but rumours had already begun to spread that Auer was behind the assassination. Acting on these false allegations, Alois Lindner, a butcher and saloon waiter, and a member of the Revolutionary Workers' Council who was a fervent supporter of Eisner, shot Auer twice with a rifle, seriously wounding him. This prompted other armed supporters of Eisner to open fire, causing a melee, killing one delegate from the Centre Party and provoking nervous breakdowns in at least two ministers.  From this point, there was effectively no government in Bavaria.

These events caused unrest and lawlessness in Bavaria, and a general strike was proclaimed by the soldiers' and workers' councils, who distributed guns and ammunition, provoking the declaration of a state of emergency. The assassination of Eisner created a martyr for the leftist cause, and prompted demonstrations, the closing of the University of Munich, the kidnapping of aristocrats, and the forced pealing of church bells. "Revenge for Eisner" rang through bullhorns in the streets. The support for the Left was greater than ever before, even greater than Eisner himself had been able to garner.

For a month, a Central Council (soviet) under Ernst Niekisch held governmental power. Then, on 7 March 1919, the new leader of the Socialists, Johannes Hoffmann, an anti-militarist and former schoolteacher, managed to patch together a parliamentary coalition government, but a month later, on the night of 6–7 April, Communists and anarchists, energized by the news of a left-wing revolution in Hungary declared a Bavarian Soviet Republic (BSR), with Ernst Toller as chief of state.  Toller called on the non-existent "Bavarian Red Army" to support the new dictatorship of the proletariat and ruthlessly deal with any counter-revolutionary behavior.

The Hoffmann government fled to Bamberg in Northern Bavaria, which it declared as the new seat of government – although most of the ministers resigned. An attempt by troops loyal to the Hoffmann government to mount a counter-coup and overthrow the BSR was put down on 13 April by the new "Red Army" created from factory workers and members of the soldiers' and workers' councils.  Twenty people died in the fighting.

The rival governments then clashed militarily at Dachau on 18 April when Hoffmann's 8,000 soldiers met the Soviet Republic's 30,000. After a coup six days into Toller's regime, the Soviet Republic was now lead by three Russian émigrés, including Eugen Leviné. The BSR forces – led by, of all people, Ernst Toller – was victorious in the first battle at Dachau, but Hoffmann made a deal which gave him the services of 20,000 men of the Freikorps under Lt. General Burghard von Oven. Oven and the Freikorps then took Dachau and surrounded Munich, panicking Egilhofer, who had the hostages he was holding executed, despite the efforts of Toller to prevent it. The Freikorps broke through the Munich defenses on 1 May, and, after the execution of at 1,000-1,200 Communists and anarchists, Oven declared the city to have been secured on 6 May, ending the Bavarian Soviet Republic.

Active participants in the Freikorps units which suppressed the Bavarian Soviet Republic included many future powerful members of the Nazi Party, including Rudolf Hess.

The Bamberg Constitution was enacted on 14 August 1919, creating the Free State of Bavaria within the new Weimar Republic.

Aftermath
The immediate effect of the existence of the People's State of Bavaria and the Bavarian Soviet Republic was to inculcate in the Bavarian people a hatred of left-wing rule.  They saw the period in which these two states existed as one of privation and shortages, censorship and restrictions on their freedoms, and general chaos and disorder.  It was seen as Schreckenensherrschaft, the "rule of horror". These feelings were then constantly to be reinforced by right-wing propaganda not only in Bavaria, but throughout the Reich, where "Red Bavaria" was held up as an object lesson in the horrors of socialism and communism.  In this way, the radical right was able to provoke and feed the fears of the peasants and the middle class. The separate strands of Bavarian right-wing extremism found a common enemy in despising the Left, and Bavaria became profoundly "reactionary, anti-Republican, [and] counter-revolutionary."

The Left itself had been neutralized after the demise of the two socialist states, and in such a way that there continued to be bad blood between the Communist Party (KPD) and the Social Democratic Party (SPD) that prevented them from working together throughout Germany. This lack of cooperation, with the Communists seeing the Social Democrats as betrayers of the Revolution, and the Social Democrats seeing the Communists as under the control of Moscow, was later to rebound to the advantage of the Nazi Party, since only a parliamentary coalition of the KPD and SPD could have prevented the Nazis from coming to power. Even at the height of their influence in the Reichstag, they did not have enough delegates to resist such a coalition.

See also
 Aftermath of World War I
 German Revolution of 1918–19
 History of Bavaria
 Bavarian Soviet Republic

References
Informational notes

Citations

Bibliography

Bavaria
Bavaria
People's State of Bavaria
Bavaria
Bavaria
Bavaria
People's State of Bavaria
History of Munich
Aftermath of World War I in Germany
German Revolution of 1918–1919
Communism in Germany